The Presbyterian Church in Cameroon (PCC) is a Reformed denomination in Cameroon and a member of the World Communion of Reformed Churches. It is the largest English-speaking church in Cameroon, founded by Basel Mission. In addition to its religious activities it contributes to provision of health and education services in the country.

History

The Basel Mission was also active in Cameroon during the 19th century. This Mission established mission stations in Southern Cameroon and Batanga. In 1892 work started among Bulu people. Later the Mission recruited German-speaking missionaries. Stations were opened in Elat, Lolodorf, Metet, Foulassi, Yaoundé, Bafia, Abong Mbang, Batouri and Momjepom. By 1894 the Bible and hymns were translated to the Bulu language.

During the First World War the administration of the German colony of Kamerun passed into British hands and the German and Swiss missionaries were called back. This had a tragic effect on the work of the mission, but a small group of faithful people continued the work, making the church a truly indigenous one. In 1925 European missionaries began returning to the country. The Second World War again disrupted church life, which was however followed by a period of intense activity and growth. The church became autonomous in 1957, at which time there were 69 000 members. A new constitution was drawn up and adopted, marking the autonomy of the church. It consists of three parts: basic principles, organization, worship and life. PCC is the biggest English-speaking Church in Cameroon, with its headquarters in Buea. The church runs 27 Presbyteries and is estimated to have one million members.

Theology
The church adheres to the Apostles Creed, the Westminster Confession of Faith, the Nicene Creed and the Heidelberg Catechism.

Activities

The church missionaries are active in the whole territory of the country. There are parishes in France, Switzerland and in the neighbouring Gabon.

The church runs four general hospitals, a rehabilitation center for leprosy patients, 17 health centres, a central pharmacy and other health facilities. Much emphasis is placed on primary health care in the villages. In the educational field the church has 35 nursery schools, 137 primary schools, 16 secondary or high schools, one technical school and a teacher training college. There is also a centre for agricultural and employment training. The pastors receive their training at the theological seminary in Kumba (66 students in 2004/05). Some are still being trained outside Cameroon, in Africa and overseas. The church had begun a university in 2007 called the Cameroon Christian University, CCU. The church has departments for women, men and youth. The radio and communication department runs its own radio station, the Christian Broadcasting Service in Buea, with branches and reporters all over the nation. It also runs two major church centers in the country, in Bamenda and Kumba with a third soon to be in Douala.

The PCC has joined other Protestant churches in Cameroon to address common issues of an educational, social, political as well as spiritual nature. It supports and promotes the information and eradication of HIV/AIDS and has a very strong policy statement on the issue.

A few years back the PCC celebrated one hundred years of the gospel in the Grassland, in Ntanfoang, Bali, where the first Basel missionaries settled. The church also celebrated its Golden Jubilee in 2007: the Golden Jubilee of its autonomy. The church runs one of the biggest printing presses in the country, has bookshops as one of its evangelical tools and also hostels to help students provide lower rates in university towns. The current Moderator is the Rt. Rev. Fonki Samuel Forba and the Synod Clerk is the Rev. Babila George Fonchang.

External relations
The PCC is a member of the World Communion of Reformed Churches, and has established fraternal relations with the Evangelical Church of Cameroon, the Presbyterian Church (USA), and the Presbyterian Church in Gabon.

References

Further reading

External links
 Denominational website

Presbyterian denominations in Africa
Protestantism in Cameroon
Members of the World Communion of Reformed Churches